Leptomyrmex darlingtoni is a species of ant in the genus Leptomyrmex. Described by William Morton Wheeler in 1934, the species is endemic to Australia.

References

External links

Dolichoderinae
Hymenoptera of Australia
Insects described in 1934